Gaochun District, formerly Gaochun County until January 2013, is one of 11 districts of Nanjing, the capital of Jiangsu province, China.

Culture
Gaochun is known for its traditional style shopping area known as Gaochun Old Street. The local language is a dialect of Wu Chinese, unlike much of Nanjing that speaks a southern variation of Mandarin.
There are many delicious foods in Gaochun. The crabs of Gucheng lake are big and in good quality. There is a crab festival every autumn, usually at the end of September to celebrate the harvest of crabs by which many tourists are attracted. Tofu in Gaochun is very famous for its delicious taste. Gaochun is full of ponds which usually have lotus in. So it has a very beautiful view of colours lotus in summers. Meanwhile, it produces much fresh and delicious lotus seed, lotus root, lotus stem, etc.

Administrative divisions
There are 8 towns that fall under the jurisdiction of Gaochun District. They are:

Climate

Education
Jiangsu Gaochun High School (1923)

References

External links
Gaochun Official Government Website
http://www.xzqh.org/quhua/32js/0125gc.htm

Districts of Nanjing